Nova is the debut album by Finnish a cappella ensemble Rajaton, released August 14, 2000. It consists of vocal arrangements of folk and contemporary Finnish poetry. The first takes were recorded in June 1999, after Rajaton won the Tampere Vocal Music Festival 1999.

Track listing

External links
 Official Rajaton website
 Rajaton - Nova at Last.fm

Rajaton albums
2000 debut albums